KHWG-FM (100.1 FM) is a radio station broadcasting a classic country format. Licensed to Crystal, Nevada, United States, the station is currently owned by Keily Miller.

References

External links

HWG